Allègre-les-Fumades is a commune in the Gard department in southern France.

Population

Sights and monuments
 Château d'Allègre: ruined castle, protected since 1997 as a monument historique.

Notable people linked to the commune
 Daniel Féret (born 1944), politician (founder of Front national in Belgium) and doctor, works at the thermal springs centre in Fumades.

See also
Communes of the Gard department

References

Communes of Gard